Pantokratoros Monastery is a Greek Orthodox monastery in the monastic state of Mount Athos in Greece. It stands on the north-eastern side of the Athos peninsula, and is dedicated to the Transfiguration of Our Lord. The monastery ranks seventh in the hierarchy of the Athonite monasteries.

History
It was founded around 1360 by the megas stratopedarches Alexios and the megas primikerios John after an imperial chrysobull was granted to them by John V Palaiologos in March 1357. By the end of the 15th century, the Russian pilgrim Isaiah confirms that, the monastery was Greek.

After a long period as an idiorrhythmic monastery, it reverted to the coenobitic system in 1992, the last monastery on Mount Athos to do so. Thirteen fathers from the Athonite monastery of Xenophontos were permitted to move in, and priestmonk Vissarion was elected as abbot. He died shortly after resigning the abbacy in 2001, and priestmonk Gabriel was elected to succeed him.

A notable monk was Benjamin of Lesbos, who was ordained as a monk in the monastery in the late 1770s and went on to become a significant figure in the Modern Greek Enlightenment.

In 1992, Vatopedi was converted from an idiorrhythmic monastery into a cenobitic one, becoming the final idiorrhythmic monastery to make the change to cenobitism.

Manuscripts
The library houses c. 350 manuscripts, and 3,500 printed books. The monastery's documents are written in Greek and Turkish. Today the monastery has about 30 monks. Notably the Uncial 051.

Sites
 is a historical bridge located at a stream behind the main monastery.

References

External links 

 Official website
 Greek Ministry of Culture: Holy Monastery of Pantokrator
 Pantokrators monastery at the Mount Athos website 
 Pantocrator - Holy Mountain
 Pantokrator Monastery at OrthodoxWiki

 
Christian monasteries established in the 14th century
Monasteries on Mount Athos
Greek Orthodox monasteries
Byzantine monasteries in Greece